The NCAA Men's Water Polo Championship is an annual tournament to determine the national champion of NCAA men's collegiate water polo. Beginning in 1969, it has been held every year except 2020, when it was postponed to March 2021 because of the COVID-19 pandemic. With a limited number of NCAA water polo programs at the national level, all men's teams, whether from Division I, Division II, or Division III, are eligible to compete each year in the National Collegiate tournament. The tournament was expanded from a four-team bracket in 2013 by adding two play-in games that are contested by the bottom four seeds, effectively creating a six-team bracket with a first-round bye for the top two teams. This makes it the sport with the fewest teams reaching the NCAA tournament; this is because there are only 43 men's water polo teams between all three NCAA divisions.

While the championship often includes teams from around the country, most programs are located within the state of California, and no school from outside California has ever surpassed third place or participated in the NCAA Men's Water Polo Championship game.

The four California based Pac-12 schools have been the most successful. The University of California, Berkeley is the most successful program with 15 titles, followed by UCLA with 12 titles, Stanford (11 titles), and USC (10 titles). One of these four schools has won the championship every year since 1998.

Championships summary 

Notes

Team titles

Recent championships

2009 Championship
Semifinals scores (Princeton University, December 5, 3:00 pm and 5:00 pm (ET)):
 #1 USC 13 vs. #4 Princeton 3; #2 UCLA 9 vs. #3 Loyola Marymount 8 (2 OT)

National Championship (Princeton University, December 6, 2:00 pm (ET)):
 #1 USC (25-2) vs. #2 UCLA (23-6)

2009 NCAA All-Tournament Teams:

 First-Team – Shea Buckner, USC; Scott Davidson, UCLA; Ben Hohl, UCLA; Tibor Forai, LMU; J. W. Krumpholz, USC; Andy Stevens, LMU; Jordan Thompson, USC (MVP)
 Second-Team  – Edgaras Asajavicius, LMU; Matt Hale, Princeton; Cullen Hennessy, UCLA; Chay Lapin, UCLA; Matt Sagehorn, USC; Josh Samuels, UCLA; Eric Vreeland, Princeton; Griffin White, UCLA; Mark Zalewski, Princeton

2010 Championship
Semifinals (December 4, 2010, Spieker Aquatics Complex, University of California, Berkeley, California)
USC def. St. Francis (NY) 10-7
California def. Loyola Marymount 7-6
Championship (December 5, 2010, Spieker Aquatics Complex, University of California, Berkeley, California)
USC def. California 12-10 (OT)

2010 NCAA All-Tournament Teams:

 First-Team – Peter Kurzeka, USC (MVP); Ivan Rackov, CAL; Zachary White, CAL; Tibor Forai, LMU; Nikola Vavic, USC; Andy Stevens, LMU; Brian Dudley, CAL  
 Second-Team  – Boris Plavsic, SFC; Ikaika Aki, LMU; Marko Gencic, SFC; Jeremy Davie, USC; Joel Dennerley, USC; Matt Burton, USC; Cory Nasoff, CAL

2011 Championship

Conferences receiving automatic qualification included the Collegiate Water Polo Association, the Mountain Pacific Sports Federation and the Western Water Polo Association. The remaining team was selected at-large without geographical restrictions.

Semifinals (December 3, 2011, Spieker Aquatics Complex, University of California, Berkeley, California)
 USC (22-3) def. Princeton (21-9) 17–4 
 UCLA (23-4) def. UC-San Diego (17-9) 10–1
Championship (December 4, 2010, Spieker Aquatics Complex, University of California, Berkeley, California)
 Third-place game, Princeton def. UC San Diego 9-7
 Championship game, USC def. UCLA 7–4

2011 NCAA All-Tournament Teams:
 First-Team – Joel Dennerley (MOP), Peter Kurzeka and Nikola Vavic, USC; Josh Samuels and Cullen Hennessy, UCLA; Thomas Nelson, Princeton and Graham Saber, UC San Diego.
 Second-team – Matt Rapacz, Griffin White and Cristiano Mirarchi, UCLA; Jeremy Davie and Mace Rapsey, USC; Drew Hoffenberg, Princeton, and Brian Donohoe, UC San Diego.

2012 Championship
The NCAA men's water polo championship was held December 1 and 2, 2012 at Southern California's McDonald’s Swim Stadium. Conferences receiving automatic qualification included the Collegiate Water Polo Association, the Mountain Pacific Sports Federation and the Western Water Polo Association.  The remaining team was selected at-large without geographical restrictions. All four championship games will be streamed live on www.NCAA.com.

Semifinals - December 1, 2012
Southern California (27-0) vs. Air Force (19-10) 4 p.m. ET
UCLA (27-4) vs. St. Francis (N.Y.) (16-8) 6:12 p.m. ET

Finals - December 2, 2012
 Third-place game played at 4 p.m. ET
 The championship game played at 6:12 p.m. ET.

2013 Championship
The NCAA men's water polo championship was held December 7 and 8, 2013 at Stanford's Avery Aquatic Center. This season marked the introduction of an expanded format. Six teams were seeded into the tournament, with the bottom four participating in Play-in games to fill the four team bracket. Four conferences received automatic qualification: the Collegiate Water Polo Association (CWPA), the Mountain Pacific Sports Federation (MPSF), Southern California Intercollegiate Athletic Conference (SCIAC), and the Western Water Polo Association (WWPA). The remaining two teams were selected at-large without geographical restrictions. The tournament was seeded by the Men’s Water Polo Committee on December 1. Conference representatives were Southern Cal (MPSF), Whittier College (SCIAC), UC San Diego (WWPA), and St. Francis College Brooklyn (CWPA).

Play-in – December 5, 2013
 Game 1: #5 St. Francis College Brooklyn (22-10) def. #4 UC San Diego (14-13) 6-5
 Game 2: #3 Stanford (21-5) def. #6 Whittier College (19-12) 20-3

Semifinals – December 7, 2013
 1 p.m. – Seed No.1 Southern Cal (26-4) def. #5 St. Francis College Brooklyn (23-10) 10–3 
 2:45 p.m. – Seed No. 2 Pacific (22-4) def. #3 Stanford (22-5) 11–10
Finals – December 8, 2013
 Third-place game played at 1 p.m.
 The championship game played at 3 p.m.

2014 Championship

The NCAA men's water polo championship was held December 6 and 7, 2014 at UC San Diego's Canyonview Aquatic Center, La Jolla, CA. The tournament continued with the new format by adding two more teams to play in the four-team play-in games. Conferences received automatic qualification were the Collegiate Water Polo Association (CWPA), the Mountain Pacific Sports Federation (MPSF), Southern California Intercollegiate Athletic Conference (SCIAC), and the Western Water Polo Association (WWPA).  The remaining teams were selected at-large without geographical restrictions. They were selected by the Men’s Water Polo Committee on November 23, 2014.

Play-in – November 29, 2014
 Game 1: #4 UC San Diego (15-9) def. #5 Brown University (26-6) 12–7
 Game 2: #3 USC (22-6) def. #6 Whittier (23-12) 19-4

Semifinals – December 6, 2014
 Game 3, 1:00 PM PT: #1 seed UCLA (27-3) def. #4 seed UC San Diego (16-9) 15–6
 Game 4, 3:12 PM PT: #3 seed USC (23-6) def. #2 seed Stanford (25-3) 12–11 in triple OT

Championship Dec. 7, 2014 
 Third-place game, 1:00 p.m. PT: #2 seed Stanford def. #4 seed UC San Diego 20–11
 National Championship Game, 3:12 p.m. PT: #1 seed UCLA  def. #3 seed USC 9–8

2015 Championship

The NCAA men's water polo championship was held December 5 and 6, 2015 at UCLA's Spieker Aquatics Center, Los Angeles. The tournament continued with the new format by adding two more teams to play in the four-team play-in games. Conferences received automatic qualification were the Collegiate Water Polo Association (CWPA), the Mountain Pacific Sports Federation (MPSF), Southern California Intercollegiate Athletic Conference (SCIAC), and the Western Water Polo Association (WWPA).  The remaining teams were selected at-large without geographical restrictions. They were selected by the Men’s Water Polo Committee on November 22, 2015.

Play-in – December 2, 2015
 Game 1: #5 UCSD (14–13) def. #4 Princeton (22–4) 12–7
 Game 2: #3 USC (20–6) def. #6 Claremont McKenna-Harvey Mudd-Scripps Colleges (21–7) 20–5

Semifinals – December 5, 2015
 Game 3, 1:00 PM PT: #1 seed UCLA (28–0) def. #5 UCSD (15–13) 17–4
 Game 4, 3:12 PM PT: #3 USC (21–6) def. #2 seed California (23–6) 9–6

Championship Dec. 6, 2015 
 Third-place game, 1:00 p.m. PT: Cal def. UCSD 20–9
 National Championship Game, 3:12 p.m. PT: UCLA def. USC 10–7

2016 Championship

California defeated USC	11-8 (2OT) for the national championship.

2017 Championship

The NCAA men's water polo championship was held December 2 and 3, 2017 at USC, Los Angeles. The tournament continued with the new format with eight teams playing for the championship. Conferences received automatic qualification are the Collegiate Water Polo Association (CWPA), Golden Coast Conference (GCC), the Mountain Pacific Sports Federation (MPSF), Northeast Water Polo Conference (NWPC), Southern California Intercollegiate Athletic Conference (SCIAC), and the Western Water Polo Association (WWPA).  The remaining two teams were selected at-large without geographical restrictions.

Opening round – November 25, 2017
Pacific defeated Pomona-Pitzer 16–2
Harvard defeated George Washington 15–13

First round – November 30, 2017
Pacific defeated UC Davis 13–12
USC defeated Harvard 16–/4

Semifinals – December 2, 2017
UCLA defeated Pacific 11–9
USC defeated California 12–11

Championship – December 3, 2017
 UCLA defeated USC 7–5

2018 Championship

The NCAA men's water polo championship was held December 1 and 2, 2018 at Avery Aquatic Center, Stanford, California. The tournament continued with the format in which eight teams competed for the championship. Teams qualifying as champions of their conferences were Long Beach State, from the Golden Coast Conference (GCC); George Washington, from the Mid-Atlantic Water Polo Conference (MAWPC); Stanford, from the Mountain Pacific Sports Federation (MPSF); Princeton, from the Northeast Water Polo Conference (NWPC); Pomona-Pitzer, from the Southern California Intercollegiate Athletic Conference (SCIAC); and UC San Diego, from the Western Water Polo Association (WWPA). The remaining two teams, Southern California (MPSF) and UCLA (MPSF), were selected at-large without geographical restrictions. Stanford, the #1 seed, and Southern California, the #2 seed, were seeded into the semifinal round, with the other six teams competing for the final two spots in opening and first-round games.

Opening round – November 24, 2018
 Long Beach St. def. Pomona-Pitzer 12–5 at Long Beach State
 George Washington def. Princeton 14–13 at Princeton

First round – November 29, 2018 (at Avery Aquatic Center, Stanford, California)
 UC San Diego def. Long Beach St. 14–9
 UCLA def. George Washington 18–6

Semifinals – December 1, 2018
 Stanford def. UC San Diego 16–7 (3:00 PM PT)
 USC def. UCLA 8–7 (5:00 PM PT)

Championship – December 2, 2018
 USC def. Stanford 14-12

2019 Championship
The NCAA men's water polo championship was held December 7 and 8, 2019 at the Chris Kjeldsen Aquatic Center, Stockton, California. Seven teams played for the championship. Teams qualifying as champions of their conferences were Pepperdine, from the Golden Coast Conference (GCC); Bucknell, from the Mid-Atlantic Water Polo Conference (MAWPC); Stanford, from the Mountain Pacific Sports Federation (MPSF); Harvard, from the Northeast Water Polo Conference (NWPC); and UC Davis, from the Western Water Polo Association (WWPA). The remaining two teams, Southern California (MPSF) and Pacific (GCC), were selected at-large without geographical restrictions. Stanford, the #1 seed, and Pacific, the #2 seed, were seeded into the semifinal round, with the other five teams competing for the final two spots.

Opening round – November 30, 2019
 Bucknell 13, Harvard 12

Opening round – Thursday, Dec. 5, 2019

 Southern California 15, Bucknell 9 
 Pepperdine 15, UC Davis 12

Semifinals – Saturday, Dec. 7, 2019

 Stanford 15, Southern California 14 (3OT)
 Pacific 17, Pepperdine 13

Championship – Sunday, Dec. 8, 2019
 Stanford 13, Pacific 8

2020 Championship

The tournament was played at the Uytengsu Aquatics Center, on the campus of USC in Los Angeles. UCLA's Nicolas Saveljic was chosen as the most valuable player after the Bruins defeated the Trojans for their 12th title.

Opening round – Thursday, March 18, 2021
 UCLA 19, California Baptist 14
 USC 18, Bucknell 9

Semifinals – Saturday, March 20, 2021
 No. 3 UCLA 11, No. 1 Stanford 10
 No. 4 USC 12, No. 2 California 10

Championship – Sunday, March 21, 2021
 No. 3 UCLA 7, No. 4 USC 6

2021 Championship

The tournament was held at the Spieker Aquatics Center, on the campus of UCLA in Los Angeles. California defeated Southern California 13-12 to win the 2021 NCAA water polo national championship. It was California's 15th title. Nikos Papanikolaou was the MVP of the tournament.

2022 Championship

The national championship was held on December 3-4, 2022 at the Spieker Aquatics Complex on the campus of the University of California, Berkeley, California. Cal defeated Southern California for the 2022 title 13–12.
First Round,  
Nov. 26, Noon: Princeton (27-5) 11 def. Fordham (26-8) 10

Quarterfinals
Game 1, Dec. 1, 3:00 PM PST: Pacific (22-6) 11 def. UC Davis (19-8) 7
Game 2, Dec. 1, 5:00 PM PST: Southern California (19-6) 11 def. Princeton (26-6) 8

Semifinals
 Game 3, Dec. 3, 2:00 PM PST: Cal (22–2) 16 def. Pacific (22–7) 9
 Game 4, Dec. 3, 4:00 PM PST: Southern California (20–6) 15 def. UCLA (22–4) 12

Final
 Cal (23-2) 13 def. Southern California (21–6) 12

See also
 Collegiate Water Polo Association
 Western Water Polo Association
 Mountain Pacific Sports Federation
 Southern California Intercollegiate Athletic Conference
 Golden Coast Conference

References

External links
 NCAA Men's Water Polo